Mantoida fulgidipennis is a species of praying mantis in the family Mantoididae.

References

F
Mantodea of North America
Insects of the Caribbean
Insects described in 1889